Nick Patterson (born December 8, 1982 in Vancouver, British Columbia) is a former goaltender in the National Lacrosse League. Patterson played parts of 11 seasons in the NLL, mostly with the Minnesota Swarm. He won the Defensive Player of the Week award four times, and was named to the second All-Pro team in both 2006 and 2007.

Statistics

NLL

References

1982 births
Living people
Canadian lacrosse players
Lacrosse people from British Columbia
Minnesota Swarm players
National Lacrosse League All-Stars
Sportspeople from Vancouver
Washington Stealth players